The Honda CRF150R is a racing dirtbike that was released in 2006 for the 2007 model year. It competes in the Mini Class against many  two-stroke bikes; however, it cannot race in the 85cc mod. or stock class. It must race in the Supermini class. All of Honda's 2008 models are four-strokes whereas in years past, some of their racing bikes were two-strokes. The 150R features a powerful Unicam four-valve liquid-cooled engine that produces impressive power at a wide RPM range that only weighs 43.6 pounds. With its fully adjustable Showa suspension, high-quality Dunlop Tires and disc brakes front and rear, this is one of the best mini racing bikes Honda has made. The CRF150R come in two versions: the regular and the Expert. 

The Expert costs an extra $100 and offering several new features specifically for larger riders. Features include a taller seat height, higher ground clearance, larger wheelbase, increased tire size, longer swing arm and larger rear sprocket for better acceleration with a heavier rider. All of these Expert features only add an additional 4 pounds. This model is referred to as the CRF150RB R meaning Race, and B meaning Big wheel.

Specifications
All specifications are manufacturer claimed.

References

External links
 2008 Honda CRF150R official Honda page for the 2008 model
 2008 Honda CRF150R Expert official Honda page for the 2008 Expert model

CRF150
Racing motorcycles